Leskhoz 5-y is a rural locality (a settlement) in Karshevitskoye Rural Settlement, Leninsky District, Volgograd Oblast, Russia. The population was 6 as of 2010.

References 

Rural localities in Leninsky District, Volgograd Oblast